Winnica (meaning "vineyard" in Polish) may refer to the following places: see Winnica Zbrodzice
Winnica, Lower Silesian Voivodeship (south-west Poland)
Winnica, Świętokrzyskie Voivodeship (south-central Poland)
Winnica, Płock County in Masovian Voivodeship (east-central Poland)
Winnica, Pułtusk County in Masovian Voivodeship (east-central Poland)
Vinnytsia, a city in central Ukraine